Distributed Denial of Secrets, abbreviated DDoSecrets, is a non-profit whistleblower site for news leaks founded in 2018. Sometimes referred to as a successor to WikiLeaks, it is best known for its June 2020 publication of a large collection of internal police documents, known as BlueLeaks. The group has also published data on Russian oligarchs, fascist groups, shell companies, tax havens and banking in the Cayman Islands, as well as data scraped from Parler in January 2021 and from the February 2021 Gab leak. The group is also known for publishing emails from military officials, City Hall in Chicago and the Washington D.C. Metropolitan Police Department. , the site hosts dozens of terabytes of data from over 200 organizations.

The site is a frequent source for other news outlets. The site's leaks have resulted in or contributed to multiple government investigations, including the second impeachment of President Donald J. Trump. During the Russo-Ukrainian War, they were considered one of the best public repositories of all the Russian files leaked since the invasion began.

History 
Distributed Denial of Secrets was founded by Emma Best, an American national security reporter known for filing prolific freedom of information requests, and another member of the group known as The Architect. According to Best, The Architect, who they already knew, approached them and expressed their desire to see a new platform for leaked and hacked materials, along with other relevant datasets. The Architect provided the initial technical expertise for the project. At its public launch in December 2018, the site held more than 1 terabyte of data from many of the highest-profile leaks. The site originally considered making all of the data public, but after feedback made some of it available only to journalists and researchers.

Best has served as a public face of the group, which lists its members. In February 2019, they told Columbia Journalism Review there were fewer than 20 people working on the project. According to Best, several early members of the project were driven to radical transparency work by their past background with the state, which they compared to Chelsea Manning and other whistleblowers. In the February 2019 interview Best said, “Those associations all ended well prior to DDoSecrets coming together and were internally disclosed early on.” In April 2021, their website listed 10 members and advisors.

In December 2019, Distributed Denial of Secrets announced their collaboration with the Organized Crime and Corruption Reporting Project. In May 2020, DDoSecrets partnered with European Investigative Collaborations and the Henri-Nannen-Journalistenschule journalism school. In June 2020, the DDoSecrets Twitter account was suspended in response to BlueLeaks, citing a breach of their policies against "distribution of hacked material" in a move that was criticized as setting a "dangerous precedent."

In December 2020, the group announced their affiliation with Harvard University's Institute for Quantitative Social Science.

Response 
DDoSecrets and the people behind the project have been described by Wired as a "transparency collective of data activists" and a successor to WikiLeaks, by the Congressional Research Service, Organized Crime and Corruption Reporting Project, Human Rights Watch and The Nation as a "transparency collective", by The Hill as a "leaktivist collective", by Columbia Journalism Review as a "journalist collective", by Brookings Institution as "a WikiLeaks-style journalist collective," by the New York Times as a "watchdog group", and Business Insider as a "freedom-of-information advocacy group", as an "alternative to WikiLeaks" by Columbia Journalism Review, Krebs On Security, ZDNet, and Forbes, and as "the most influential leaking organization on the internet" by VICE News."

Government response 
In 2019, the Congressional Research Service recognized Distributed Denial of Secrets as a transparency collective. In 2020, the U.S. counterintelligence strategy described leaktivists and public disclosure organizations like Distributed Denial of Secrets as “significant threats,” alongside five countries, three terrorist groups, and “transnational criminal organizations.” A June 2020 bulletin created by the Department of Homeland Security's Office of Intelligence and Analysis described them as a "criminal hacker group". Elements of the report were challenged as inaccurate by media such as The Verge.

The next month, the Internal Revenue Service (IRS) recognized the group as a 501(c)(3) non-profit.

Publications

2018 
In December 2018, DDoSecrets listed a leak from Russia's Ministry of Internal Affairs, portions of which detailed the deployment of Russian troops to Ukraine at a time when the Kremlin was denying a military presence there. About half of the material from that leak was published in 2014; the other half emerged in 2016. WikiLeaks reportedly rejected a request to host the full cache of files in 2016, at a time when founder Julian Assange was focused on exposing Democratic Party documents passed to WikiLeaks by Kremlin hackers.

2019 
In January 2019, DDoSecrets published hundreds of gigabytes of hacked Russian documents and emails from pro-Kremlin journalists, oligarchs, and militias.

In November 2019, DDoSecrets published over 2 terabytes of data from the Cayman National Bank and Trust. The files were provided by the hacktivist known as Phineas Fisher, and included lists of the bank's politically exposed clients. The leak was used by researchers to study how elites use offshore banking. In December 2019, DDoSecrets published "#29 Leaks" in partnership with the Organized Crime and Corruption Reporting Project. The 450 gigabytes of data came from Formations House (now The London Office), a "company mill" which registered and operated companies for clients included organized crime groups, state-owned oil companies, and fraudulent banks. The release was compared to both the Panama Papers and the Paradise Papers. Belgian tax authorities initiated an investigation based on the Cayman bank and Formations House leaks.

In December 2019, DDoSecrets published "PacoLeaks" and "MilicoLeaks": data from Chilean military police and military. PacoLeaks revealed police personnel data, extensive police files on activist groups and leaders, and evidence that the police had infiltrated activist groups MilicoLeaks included details on Chilean army intelligence, including operations, finance and international relations.

2020 

In 2020, DDoSecrets published a copy of the Bahamas corporate registry. DDoSecrets partnered with European Investigative Collaborations and the German Henri-Nannen-Schule journalism school to create the Tax Evader Radar, a project to review the dataset of almost one million documents. The project exposed the offshore holdings of prominent Germans, the tax activities of ExxonMobil, as well as offshore business entities belonging to the DeVos and Prince families.

In March 2020, DDoSecrets published 156 gigabytes of data hacked from the Myanmar Investment Commission. The leak also revealed how millions of dollars allegedly flowed from Mytel subscribers to Myanmar military generals, and exposed business dealings of family members of prominent military leaders.

In April 2020, DDoSecrets published almost 10million messages from more than 100 Discord servers used by neo-Nazi and QAnon conspiracy theorist groups. The leaked chats showed threats of violence and attempts to influence the 2018 United States midterm elections.

On June 19, 2020, DDoSecrets released BlueLeaks, which consisted of 269 gigabytes of internal U.S. law enforcement data obtained from fusion centers by the hacker collective Anonymous. DDoSecrets called it the "largest published hack of American law enforcement agencies." Betsy Reed described BlueLeaks as the U.S. law enforcement equivalent to the Pentagon Papers.

In July 2020, DDoSecrets released documents relating to the United States' case against WikiLeaks founder Julian Assange. The release also included chat logs and letters between Assange and various sources.

2021 
In January 2021, DDoSecrets made videos scraped from Parler available to journalists. Some of these videos were later used as evidence during the second impeachment trial of Donald Trump.

In February 2021, DDoSecrets gave journalists access to hundreds of thousands of financial documents from the Myanmar Directorate of Investment and Company Administration (DICA). Justice For Myanmar called the release "biggest leak in Myanmar history."

On February 28, DDoSecrets revealed "GabLeaks", a collection of more than 70 gigabytes of data from Gab, including more than 40 million posts, passwords, private messages, and other leaked information. The group said that they would not release the data publicly because it contained a large amount of private and sensitive information, and instead shared the data with select journalists, social scientists, and researchers.

In April 2021, Distributed Denial of Secrets made donor information from the Christian crowdfunding site GiveSendGo available to journalists and researchers. The information identified previously anonymous high-dollar donors to far-right actors including members of the Proud Boys, many of whose fundraising efforts were directly related to the 2021 United States Capitol attack.

Also in April 2021, DDoSecrets published a cache of emails from Chicago City Hall. The emails revealed that the city's handling of fatal shootings by police officers violates state law and a federal consent decree. The emails also exposed the Mayor's secret lobbying for qualified immunity, a secret drone program funded with off-the-books cash, and the city's problems with police chases and the George Floyd protests.

In May 2021, DDoSecrets republished the leak of Washington D.C.'s Metropolitan Police Department, including over 90,000 emails. Among other things, the files revealed details of surveillance of right-wing extremists and the response to the 2021 United States Capitol attack.

In September 2021, DDoSecrets publicly released emails and chat logs from the American far-right Oath Keepers organization to the public. They also provided member and donor data to the press. This exposed hundreds of members in law enforcement, over a hundred members with ties to the military and dozens in political office.

In November 2021, DDoSecrets released 1.8 terabytes of police helicopter surveillance footage from the Dallas Police Department and the Georgia State Patrol.

2022 
In February 2022, after many anonymous donors supported the 2022 Freedom Convoy, DDoSecrets began providing journalists and researchers with a hacked list of donors' personal information from GiveSendGo. Later that month, GiveSendGo was hacked again, exposing donors for every campaign in the site's history, which DDoSecrets gave to journalists and researchers.

During the Russo-Ukrainian War, DDoSecrets published more than 40 datasets of Russian leaks, totaling at least 5.8 terabytes. Emma Best estimated that the group had published over six million Russian documents in under two months after the war began. NBC News reported that the site "might be the single best public repository of all the Russian files purportedly leaked since the start of the invasion", and The Intercept wrote that it had become the "de facto home" for Russian leaks.

In September, they published Fuerzas Represivas, a collection of military documents from Latin America and Mexico totaling more than 13 terabytes, which Emma Best called "the largest leak in history."

See also
Cryptome
International Consortium of Investigative Journalists
Offshore Leaks

References

External links 

Classified documents
Freedom of speech
Freedom of expression
Internet leaks
Investigative journalism
National security
News leaks
Online archives
Online organizations
Organizations established in 2018
Transparency (behavior)
WikiLeaks
Whistleblowing
Whistleblower support organizations
Open government